Linda C. Teagan (born May 13, 1944 in Newton, Massachusetts) is an American attorney and politician who represented the 1st Plymouth District in the Massachusetts House of Representatives from 1995 to 1997 and was a member of the Plymouth, Massachusetts board of selectmen from 1993 to 1995 and again from 1998 to 1999

References

1944 births
Republican Party members of the Massachusetts House of Representatives
People from Plymouth, Massachusetts
Boston University alumni
Boston University School of Law alumni
Living people
Women state legislators in Massachusetts
21st-century American women